"Good morning" is a common greeting in the English language. It may also refer to:

Television 
 Good Morning!!! (Australian show), a children's show
 Good Morning (New Zealand show), a daytime talk show
 Good Morning (Russian show), a news talk show
 Good Morning (CBS), a predecessor of the American news talk show The Early Show
 GMTV, a former national UK breakfast television contractor
 "Good Morning", an episode of the television series Teletubbies

Film 
 Good Morning (1955 film), a Russian film
 Good Morning (1959 film), a Japanese film
 Good Morning, a 2008 short Japanese animated film featured in Ani*Kuri15
 Good Morning (2022 film), a South Korean film
 Good Mourning (film)

Music

Artists
 Good Morning (duo), an Australian indie rock duo

Albums
 Good Morning, a 1976 album by Daevid Allen, or the title song
 GO:OD AM, a 2015 album by Mac Miller

Songs
 "Good Morning" (1939 song), a song by Nacio Herb Brown from the 1939 film Babes in Arms, also used in the 1952 musical Singin' in the Rain
 "Good Morning" (Kanye West song), a 2007 song by American hip-hop artist Kanye West
 "Good Morning", a song by D'Cinnamons
 "Good Morning", a song by Eggstone from Somersault
 "Good Morning", a song by Grouplove from Big Mess
 "Good Morning", a song by Blackfoot from Marauder
 "Good Morning", a song by Lionel Richie from Just Go
 "Good Morning" (Chamillionaire song), a 2009 hip-hop single
 "Good Morning", a song by John Legend from Evolver
 "Good Morning", a song by Rogue Wave from Permalight, 2010
 "Good Mornin', a song by You Am I
 Goodmorning", a song by Bleachers from Gone Now

Other uses 
 Good-morning, a weight training exercise
 Good Morning (magazine), Magazine published by Ellis Jones and cartoonist Art Young from 1919 to 1921

See also
 Good Morning Good Morning, a 1967 song by the Beatles
 Good Mourning, a 2003 album by Alkaline Trio
 God morgon (disambiguation)
 
 

English phrases